"Song of Life" is the fourth single released by English electronic group Leftfield and the first on a CD single release. The song was released on 12" and CD on 30 November 1992. The sleeve of the single had the footnote "dedicated to the memory of Steve Walters whose support, friendship and encouragement will never be forgotten". It reached #59 in the UK charts. The song was also used as the backing track for Channel 4's Dispatches programme. The Remix 12" featured two remixes by British electronic music then-trio Underworld: "The Lemon Interrupt Mix", as well as the "Steppin' Razor Mix", which both feature on Sasha & John Digweed's mix album Renaissance: The Mix Collection. The track appears in the movie Lara Croft: Tomb Raider and its soundtrack.

Impact and legacy
British DJ and record producer John Digweed picked the song as one of his favourites in 1996, adding, "Another classic record from 'Reneissance'. I've got lots of good memories of the track. I still play it today and it still goes down really well."

Track listing
 12"
 "Song of Life" - 9:13
 "Dub of Life" - 5:08
 "Fanfare of Life" - 6:08

 CD
 "Song of Life" (Radio Edit) - 4:18
 "Song of Life" (Extended Version) - 8:44
 "Fanfare of Life" - 6:05
 "Release the Dub" - 5:45

 Remix 12"
 "Song of Life" (Steppin' Razor Mix) - 8:24
 "Release the Horns" - 6:08
 "Song of Life" (The Lemon Interrupt Mix) - 10:21

Charts

References

1992 singles
Leftfield songs
1992 songs
Music Week number-one dance singles